Karaağaç is a village in Gömeç district of Balıkesir Province of Turkey near the Aegean sea.

Villages in Balıkesir Province